Veprecula is a genus of sea snails, marine gastropod mollusks in the family Raphitomidae.

Description
(Original description) This genus has been created by Melvill in 1917 for a series of deep-water species of Clathurella with several peculiarities.

The small, thin, delicate shell has a pale brown or white, fusiform spire, either very attenuate, or pagodiform, or broader, and ventricose, always much suturally impressed. The shell contains 10-12 whorls with 4-5  whorlsin the protoconch. The first of these is smooth, the second to the fourth or fifth are very finely longitudinally radially costulate. The
remainder are either few or closely ribbed, crossed by frequent or more distant lirations, acutely echinate at the points of junction, 
interstices appearing deeply seated, almost smooth, quadrate or oblong. The aperture  is oblong. The outer lip is thin. The sinus is deep and wide, situated immediately below the suture. The siphonal canal is produced and fusiform.

Species
Species within the genus Veprecula include:
 Veprecula arethusa (Dall, 1918)
 Veprecula bandensis Sysoev, 1997
 Veprecula brunonia (Dall, 1924)
 Veprecula cooperi Mestayer, 1919
 Veprecula crystallina Stahlschmidt, Chino & Kilburn, 2012
 Veprecula echinulata (Thiele, 1925)
 Veprecula gracilispira (Smith E. A., 1879)
 Veprecula hedleyi (Melvill, 1904)
 Veprecula pungens (Gould, 1860)
 Veprecula scala Hedley, 1922
 Veprecula sculpta (Hinds, 1843)
 Veprecula spanionema (Melvill, 1917)
 Veprecula sykesii (Melvill & Standen, 1903)
 Veprecula tornipila McLean & Poorman, 1971
 Veprecula vacillata Hedley, 1922
 Veprecula vepratica (Hedley, 1903)
Species brought into synonymy
 Veprecula menecharmes Melvill, 1923: synonym of  Tritonoturris menecharmes (Melvill, 1923)
 Veprecula morra (Dall, 1881): synonym of Rimosodaphnella morra (Dall, 1881)
 Veprecula polyacantha Stahlschmidt, Chino & Kilburn, 2012: synonym of Famelica polyacantha (Stahlschmidt, Chino & Kilburn, 2012) (original combination)
 Veprecula reticulosa Smith, 1882: synonym of Veprecula arethusa (Dall, 1918)
 Veprecula togetoges Nomura & Niino, 1940: synonym of Veprecula arethusa (Dall, 1918)

References

 Bouchet P., Kantor Yu.I., Sysoev A. & Puillandre N. (2011) A new operational classification of the Conoidea. Journal of Molluscan Studies 77: 273-308

External links
 
 Worldwide Mollusc Species Data Base: Raphitomidae
 

 
Raphitomidae
Gastropod genera